Hostelling International (HI), formerly known as International Youth Hostel Federation (IYHF), is a grouping of more than seventy National Youth Hostel Associations in over eighty countries, with over 4,000 affiliated hostels around the world. Hostelling International is a non-governmental, not-for-profit organisation working with the United Nations Educational, Scientific and Cultural Organisation UNESCO and the World Tourism Organisation UNWTO.

Origins of youth hostelling and the IYHF
The youth hostel movement began in 1909 when Richard Schirrmann, a German schoolteacher, and Wilhelm Münker, a conservationist, saw a need for overnight accommodation for school groups wanting to experience the countryside. They started with schools being used during the holidays, and the first  (youth hostel) was opened in Schirrmann's own school, in Altena, Westphalia. In 1912, a hostel in Altena Castle superseded the school building, and  a hostel still stands in the castle grounds. Schirrmann thus founded the nationwide German Youth Hostel Association in 1919.

The movement spread worldwide, leading to the founding of the International Youth Hostel Federation (IYHF) in October 1932 in Amsterdam by representatives from associations in Switzerland, Czechoslovakia, Germany, Poland, Netherlands, Norway, Denmark, Britain, Ireland, France, and Belgium. In 1933, Richard Schirrmann became the president, but the German Government forced him to resign in 1936.

Youth hostels originally differed in setup from other modern hostels, although the growing popularity of backpacking culture forced them to adapt so as not to lose customers, most notably abandoning the idea of chores in all but a few of their locations.

Modern organisation

Seventy-one National Youth Hostel Associations are members of Hostelling International, with over 4,000 hostels worldwide. Based in Welwyn Garden City, near London, the organisation provides services for travellers and coordinates the national organisations. It also facilitates youth work and international and cross-cultural understanding in conjunction with UNESCO.
Hostelling International celebrated its eightieth anniversary in 2012, with the first International Conference being held in the YMCA hotel in Amsterdam in 1932. Eleven National Associations were present at the conference, and an agreement was reached on a standard international pattern for membership cards and on minimum standards for the equipment and supervision of youth hostels. Since 1946, the HI network has recorded over 1.6 billion overnights.

Though the parent organization has charity status in the UK, not all member organizations have charity or nonprofit status. Hostelling International Canada lost a legal battle for charity status in 2008, and the YHA in England and Wales considered becoming a commercial company during a 2005 consultation, partially in response to increased competition from independent for-profit hostels.

With nearly four million members, HI is one of the world’s largest youth membership organisations and is the only global network of youth hostel associations.

See also
 :Category: Hostelling International member associationspages for individual member associations of HI

References

Citations

Sources

 Coburn, Oliver. Youth Hostel Story. London: National Council of Social Service, 1950.
 Grassl, Anton and Heath, Graham.  The Magic Triangle: a short history of the world youth hostel movement. [S.l.]: International Youth Hostel Federation, 1982.
 Heath, Graham. Richard Schirrmann, the first youth hosteller. Copenhagen : International Youth Hostel Federation, 1962.

External links
 

Backpacking
Youth hostelling
Youth organizations established in 1932
International organisations based in the United Kingdom
Charities based in Hertfordshire
Hospitality companies of Hong Kong